Cristulosia is a genus of moths in the subfamily Arctiinae. The genus was erected by Hervé de Toulgoët in 1958.

Species
 Cristulosia bilunata Toulgoët, 1958
 Cristulosia deceptans Toulgoët, 1956

References

External links

Lithosiini